Gunārs Bumbulis (born 10 October 1974) is a Latvian bobsledder. He competed in the four man event at the 2002 Winter Olympics.

References

External links
 

1974 births
Living people
Latvian male bobsledders
Olympic bobsledders of Latvia
Bobsledders at the 2002 Winter Olympics
People from Ventspils